Bolshevo railway station is a railway station in Moscow Oblast, Russia. It is located on the Mytishchi-Fryazino section of the Yaroslavsky suburban railway line. It is part of the Naukograd, or science city, of Korolyov.

History
It takes its name from the historic settlement of Bolshevo. The station was opened 1896 as part of the Shchyolkovo-Mytishchi branch.
A historic photograph of the station was featured in the 2019 exhibition Station Bolshevo: the crossroads of fate, 1939.

Photos

References

Railway stations in Moscow Oblast
Railway stations in the Russian Empire opened in 1896
Railway stations of Moscow Railway